Quinton is an unincorporated community and census-designated place (CDP) located within Quinton Township, in Salem County, New Jersey, United States. As of the 2010 United States Census, the CDP's population was 1,402.

Geography
According to the United States Census Bureau, Quinton CDP had a total area of 0.908 square miles (2.354 km2), including 0.885 square miles (2.293 km2) of land and 0.023 square miles (0.061 km2) of water (2.57%).

Demographics

Census 2010

References

Census-designated places in Salem County, New Jersey
Quinton Township, New Jersey